Rahamat Tarikere (born 26 August 1959) is a Kannada writer, critic and teacher. He is well known for his sharp insights and his critical view on culture.  He is one noted writers of the new generation of writers in Kannada. Currently he is a Professor in Kannada University at Hampi.

Early life and education
He was born on 26 August 1959 at Samatala village in Tarikere Taluk in Chikkamagaluru district in Karnataka state, India. He completed his BA with a university First rank. He bagged seven Gold Medals for the M.A. in Kannada Literature from Mysore University.

Literary work
 Prathi samskruthi (collection of articles) 1993
 Maradolagina Kicchu (collection of articles) 1984
 Samskruthika Adhyayana (2004)
 Loka Virodhigala Jotheyalli (15 Interviews) 2006
 Kattiyanchina Daari (collection of articles) 2009
 Prathi Samskruthi (A Study on Counter culture) 1993
 Karnatakada Sufigalu (A Study on Sufism of Karnataka) 1998
 Andamaan Kanasu (Travelogue) 2000
 KadaLi hokku bande (Travelogue) 2011
 Nadedashtoo naadu (Travelogue) 2012)
 Amirbai karnataki (Monograph) 2012
 Netu bidda navilu (collection of articles) 2013
 Karnatakada Moharrum (A Study on Moharam) 2014
 Samshodhana meemaamse (A handbook on Research Methodology 2014)
 Geramaradi KathegaLu (Ed. Folk tales) 2016
 karnataka shaktapantha (A Study on Shaktism) 2017
 Gurupra Qadri Tatvapada (Ed. songs a Sufi poet) 2017
 Tatvapada Praveshike (Ed.with Arun, Articles on Mysticism) 2017
 Sanna Sangathi (colelcton of Thoughts) 2018
 Nettara Sutaka (collection of articles) 2018
 Bagila Maathu (Prefaces 2018)
 Rajadharma (A Study on political texts of Mysore odeyars and Diwans) 2019
 Hittala jagattu (collection of lighter essays) 2019
 NyayanishTurigala Jatheyalli (15 Interviews) 2020
 Karnataka Gurupantha (A Study on Avadhuta and Aroodhas) 2020
"HaasuHokku" (collection of articles) 2021

Awards and recognition
 Karnataka Sahitya Academy Award for his collection of essays: Prathisamskruti (1993)
 Karnataka Sahitya Academy award for his Research on sufis of Karnataka (1998)
 Karnataka Sahitya Academy award for his travelogue Andaman Kanasu 2000
 Sahitya Akademi Award in 2010 for Kattiyanchina Daari (returned)
 Karnataka Sahitya Akademy Honorary Award (2013) (Did not receive)

References

External links
 Kannada University profile

Kannada literature
1959 births
Living people
Recipients of the Sahitya Akademi Award in Kannada